Following is a table of United States presidential elections in Ohio, ordered by year. Since its admission to statehood in 1803, Ohio has participated in every U.S. presidential election.

Ohio was considered a swing state, being won by either the Democratic or Republican candidates from election to election. As a swing state, Ohio is usually targeted by both major-party campaigns, especially in competitive elections. Pivotal in the election of 1888, Ohio has been a regular swing state since 1980.

Additionally, Ohio is considered a bellwether. Historian R. Douglas Hurt asserts that not since Virginia "had a state made such a mark on national political affairs". The Economist notes that "This slice of the mid-west contains a bit of everything American—part north-eastern and part southern, part urban and part rural, part hardscrabble poverty and part booming suburb". In the time since the Civil War, Ohio has had ten misses (eight Democratic winners, one Democratic-Republican winner and one Whig winner) in the Presidential election (John Quincy Adams in 1824, Martin Van Buren in 1836, James Polk in 1844, Zachary Taylor in 1848, James Buchanan in 1856, Grover Cleveland in 1884 and 1892, Franklin D. Roosevelt in 1944, John F. Kennedy in 1960, and Joe Biden in 2020), and prior to the 2020 election it also had the longest consistent perfect streak of any state, voting for the winning presidential candidate in each election from 1964 to 2016 — a streak that ended when Joe Biden won in 2020.  No Republican has ever won the presidency without winning Ohio, and since the advent of the duopoly two-party system, Democrats have won the presidency without winning Ohio only eight times, in the elections noted above.

Winners of the state are in bold.

Party abbreviations:
 D = Democratic
 R = Republican
 D-R = Democratic-Republican
 Fed. = Federalist
 Prog. = Progressive (three distinct parties in 1912, 1924 and 1948, respectively)
 Am. Ind. = American Independent Party (1968) 
 States' Rights D = States' Rights Democrats ("Dixiecrats") of 1948
 Lib. R = Liberal Republican Party ("Mugwumps") in 1872
 Const'l Union = Constitutional Union Party (1860)
 N. Dem = Northern Democratic Party (1860)
 S. Dem = Southern Democratic Party (1860)
 Nat'l R  = National Republican Party (1828 & 1832, later merging into the Whig Party).

Elections from 1864 to present

Election of 1860
The election of 1860 was a complex realigning election in which the breakdown of the previous two-party alignment culminated in four parties each competing for influence in different parts of the country. The result of the election, with the victory of an ardent opponent of slavery, spurred the secession of eleven states and brought about the American Civil War.

Elections from 1828 to 1856

Election of 1824

The election of 1824 was a complex realigning election following the collapse of the prevailing Democratic-Republican Party, resulting in four different candidates each claiming to carry the banner of the party, and competing for influence in different parts of the country. The election was the only one in history to be decided by the House of Representatives under the provisions of the Twelfth Amendment to the United States Constitution after no candidate secured a majority of the electoral vote. It was also the only presidential election in which the candidate who received a plurality of electoral votes (Andrew Jackson) did not become President, a source of great bitterness for Jackson and his supporters, who proclaimed the election of Adams a corrupt bargain.

Note: The national popular vote (from 18 of 24 states, the other six had electors chosen by the state legislature) was Jackson 41.36%, Adams 30.92%, Clay 12.99% and Crawford 11.21%. After none of the candidates had a majority on the electoral college, Adams won the contingent election in the House of Representatives.

Elections from 1804 to 1820

In the election of 1820, incumbent President James Monroe ran effectively unopposed, winning all eight of Ohio’s electoral votes, and all electoral votes nationwide except one vote in New Hampshire. To the extent that a popular vote was held, it was primarily directed to filling the office of Vice President.

See also
 Elections in Ohio

Notes

References